Murray's Steps is an album by David Murray released on the Italian Black Saint label in 1982. It feature his Octet consisting of Murray, Henry Threadgill, Bobby Bradford, Lawrence "Butch" Morris, Craig Harris, Curtis Clark, Wilber Morris and Steve McCall.

Reception
The Allmusic review by Scott Yanow awarded the album 5 stars, stating, "The octet is perfect for David Murray as an outlet for his writing, a showcase for his compositions, and an inspiring vehicle for his tenor and bass clarinet solos. For the third octet album (all are highly recommended), Murray meets up with quite a talented group of individuals: altoist Henry Threadgill, trumpeter Bobby Bradford, cornetist Butch Morris, trombonist Craig Harris, pianist Curtis Clark, bassist Wilber Morris, and drummer Steve McCall. Their interpretations of four of Murray's originals – "Murray's Steps," "Sweet Lovely," "Sing Song," and "Flowers for Albert"—are emotional, adventurous, and exquisite (sometimes all three at the same time).".

Track listing 
 "Murray's Steps" – 12:25  
 "Sweet Lovely" – 8:00  
 "Sing Song" – 9:40  
 "Flowers for Albert" – 9:40  
 
All compositions by David Murray
 Recorded at Barigozzi Studios, Milano, July 14, 15 & 19,1982

Personnel 
 David Murray – tenor saxophone, bass clarinet
 Henry Threadgill – alto saxophone
 Bobby Bradford – trumpet
 Lawrence "Butch" Morris – cornet
 Craig Harris – trombone
 Curtis Clark – piano
 Wilber Morris – bass
 Steve McCall – drums

References 

1982 albums
David Murray (saxophonist) albums
Black Saint/Soul Note albums